Sisay Lemma Kasaye (born 12 December 1990) is an Ethiopian long-distance runner.

Career 
Sisay Lemma began his running career at the age of 17 and initially competed barefoot due to a lack of running shoes.

In 2012, he won the Maratona d’Italia. In 2013,  he was fifth in the Tiberias Marathon, won the Orlen Warsaw Marathon and finished fourth at the Eindhoven Marathon.

In 2015, he was fifth at the Dubai Marathon in January in 2:07:06, won the Vienna City Marathon in April in 2:07:31 and the Frankfurt Marathon in October where he ran a personal best of 2:06:26.

In 2016 he improved his best to 2:05:16 at the Dubai Marathon where he finished fourth.

In 2017 he was third at the Dubai Marathon in January and fourth at the Chicago Marathon in October but did not finish the Boston Marathon in April.

In 2018 he began the season with fifth-place finish at the Dubai Marathon on 26 January with a personal best 2:04:08. In October, he broke the Ljubljana Marathon record with time 2:04:58.

He finished third at the 2019 Berlin Marathon, improving his personal best to 2:03:36.

In 2020, he finished third at the Tokyo Marathon on 1 March in 2:04:51.

At the 2020 London Marathon, he finished in third place with a time of 2.05:45.

Sisay won the 2021 London Marathon, in a time of 2.04.01.

Personal bests
Outdoor

References

External links 
 

Ethiopian male marathon runners
1990 births
Living people
Frankfurt Marathon male winners
Athletes (track and field) at the 2020 Summer Olympics
Olympic athletes of Ethiopia
Olympic male marathon runners
London Marathon male winners
21st-century Ethiopian people